Muhammad Yusuf (given name: Muhammadjon Yusupov, 1954−2001) was an Uzbek poet.

Yusuf was born in 1954 in the Marhamat district of Andizhan within the Uzbek SSR, Soviet Union. He was known as Uzbek poet in 1998. He wrote many books, most notably  ("Cheater fiancee" in English) in 1993, in 1998  ("Taking to Sky" in English), and {[transl|uz|Ulug'imsan, vatanim}} ("The great homeland" in English) in 2001.

General References 
Uzbekistan Writers' Union

References

1954 births
2001 deaths
20th-century Uzbekistani poets
21st-century Uzbekistani poets
Uzbekistani male poets
20th-century male writers
21st-century male writers